William Charles Oster (January 2, 1933 – June 6, 2020) was an American Major League Baseball pitcher. He played for the Philadelphia Athletics during the 1954 season.

Oster was signed by the Athletics as an amateur free agent on August 20, 1954, and made his debut 3 days later. His only decision came a little over a month later in his final MLB game when the Athletics were defeated by the New York Yankees, 10–2.

Born in New York City, Oster died on June 6, 2020, in Centerport, New York.

References

External links

1933 births
2020 deaths
Major League Baseball pitchers
Philadelphia Athletics players
NYU Violets baseball players
Baseball players from New York City
Abilene Blue Sox players
Columbia Gems players
Lancaster Red Roses players
Minot Mallards players
Savannah A's players